Reynaldo Rey (born Harry Reynolds; January 27, 1940 – May 28, 2015) was an American actor, comedian, and television personality.

Career
Rey moved to Cleveland, Ohio, where he taught for seven years and became a member of the Karamu House Theatre, world-renowned for its development of top-notch actors, directors and producers. There, he launched his career in comedy, going on the road with the O'Jays. He then moved to New York City, where he was invited to join the Harlem Theater Group. While a member of the group, he appeared in his first movie. From there he performed in Europe, Asia and Africa for two years. Rey has appeared in 52 movies, including Friday, House Party 3, White Men Can't Jump, A Rage in Harlem, and Harlem Nights, where he appeared with the likes of Redd Foxx (his mentor, for whom he often opened shows), Della Reese, Richard Pryor, Arsenio Hall, and Eddie Murphy. He also has 32 television shows to his credit, including BET's Comic View, 1998–1999, 2000–2001, on which he was a co-host, The Tonight Show, Robert Townsend's Parents in Crime, and The Parent Hood, and 227 as Ray the Mailman. He also appeared on a show called Noah's Arc. Rey also recorded three comedy albums and three videos. He produced his own video, which features a rap he wrote called "I’m Scared A  U" after overwhelming audience reaction to it on Russell Simmons' Def Comedy Jam. Rey also appeared twice in 1973 as a contestant on the popular game show Match Game. He was brought back due to a technicality, and would go on to win 3 games, and a total of 650 dollars.

Death
Rey died on May 28, 2015, due to complications from a stroke he suffered a year prior.

He is interred in the Forest Lawn Memorial Park (Hollywood Hills).

Partial filmography

Disco Sexpot (1979)
Young Doctors in Love (1982) – The Cops – Cicerelli
Harlem Nights (1989) – Gambler
Far Out Man (1990) – Lou
A Rage in Harlem (1991) – Blind Man
The Three Muscatels (1991) – King Alberto Nacho
White Men Can't Jump (1992) – Tad
Bébé's Kids (1992) – Lush (voice)
House Party 3 (1994) – Veda's Dad
Friday (1995) – Red's Father
Sprung (1997) – Brotha #2
Fakin' da Funk (1997) – Earnest
The Breaks (1999) – Uncle Deion
Jackie's Back (1999, TV Movie) – Cadillac Johnson (Retired Pimp)
Play It to the Bone (1999) – Sportswriter
Little Richard (2000, TV Movie) – Sugarfoot Sam
The Cheapest Movie Ever Made (2000)
For da Love of Money (2002) – Pops
The Sunday Morning Stripper (2003, Short) – Elder Jenkins
Survival of the Illest (2004) – Old School
Super Spy (2004)
My Big Phat Hip Hop Family (2005) – Terrell Mathis
Treasure n tha Hood (2005) – Willie
Issues (2005) – Mr. Livingston
Who Made the Potato Salad? (2006) – Mr. Brown
Uncle P (2006) – MailmanEverybody Hates Chris (2007, TV Series) – Mr. LesterDivine Intervention (2007) – Deacon JonesFirst Sunday (2008) – Soul JoeInternet Dating (2008) – Mr. BentayAmerican Dream (2008) – ManagerPawn Shop'' (2012) – Rey's Pal (final film role)

References

External links

1940 births
2015 deaths
African-American male actors
African-American screenwriters
Screenwriters from Ohio
American male film actors
American male television actors
Burials at Forest Lawn Memorial Park (Hollywood Hills)
People from Sequoyah County, Oklahoma
Male actors from Cleveland
Emporia State University alumni
Male actors from Oklahoma
American people who self-identify as being of Native American descent
20th-century American male actors
21st-century American male actors
Screenwriters from Oklahoma
Comedians from Oklahoma
Comedians from Ohio
20th-century African-American people
21st-century African-American people